God's Inn by the Sea is a 1911 silent film dramatic short directed by R.F. Baker(Richard Foster Baker) and starring Francis X. Bushman. It was produced by the Essanay Film Manufacturing Company and distributed by the General Film Company. Released in split-reel form with Her Dad the Constable.

Cast
Francis X. Bushman

See also
Francis X. Bushman filmography

References

External links
God's Inn by the Sea at IMDb.com

1911 films
American silent short films
1911 short films
Essanay Studios films
Silent American drama films
1911 drama films
American black-and-white films
1910s American films